Dicepolia marginescriptalis is a moth in the family Crambidae. It was described by George Hamilton Kenrick in 1917. It is found on Madagascar.

References

Moths described in 1917
Odontiinae